Jakiškiai Manor was a former residential manor in Jakiškiai village, Joniškis District Municipality, Lithuania.

References

Manor houses in Lithuania